Yibal is the largest oilfield in Oman, located in the Ad Dhahirah Governorate, about 360km southwest of Muscat. The Yibal oil field is operated primarily by Petroleum Development Oman.

Yibal Khuff Project

UK-based Petrofac was selected to oversee the development of the giant Yibal Khuff project as part of an engineering, procurement and construction management contract in 2015. Petrofac said at the time that the contract value was around $900 million.  

The Yibal Khuff Project (YKP) started operating in 2021 September, employing 1,200 Omanis and 200 foreign nationals. At full operation the project will produce five million cubic metres of gas per day and around 20,000 barrels per day of crude oil. 

Oil fields of Oman
Geography of Oman

References